2000–01 Hong Kong FA Cup was the 26th staging of the Hong Kong FA Cup. 

It was competed by all of the 8 teams from Hong Kong First Division League. The competition kicked off on 8 April 2001 and finished on 29 April with the final.

Instant-Dict won the cup for the third time after beating South China by 2-1 in the final.

Fixtures and results

Bracket

Final

References

Hong Kong FA Cup
Hong Kong Fa Cup
Fa Cup